Pilot Rock High School is a public high school located in Pilot Rock, Oregon, United States.  It has five buildings, which were constructed between 1919 and 1955.

Academics
In 2008, 93% of the school's seniors received a high school diploma. Of 30 students, 28 graduated, one dropped out, and one received a modified diploma.

References

Educational institutions established in 1919
Public middle schools in Oregon
High schools in Umatilla County, Oregon
Public high schools in Oregon
1919 establishments in Oregon